The Heideman Award is given each year to the winner of the National Ten-Minute Play Contest, a competition hosted by Actors Theatre of Louisville.  The $1,000 cash prize award was established in 1979 by Louisville, Kentucky native Ted Heideman.

Past winners
 2013 Halfway by Emily Schwend
 2012 The Ballad of 423 and 424 by Nicholas C. Pappas
 2011 Compatible by Ana Li,  Waterbabies by Adam LeFevre
 2010 The Famished by Max Posner, 
The Last Hat, a Tragedy by Kyle John Schmidt
Lobster Boy by Dan Dietz
 2007 I am not Batman by Marco Ramirez
 2004 Johannes, Pyotr & Marge by Jeffrey Essmann,  Picnic (pic-nic): vi by Brendan Healy 
 2003 Fit for Feet by Jordan Harrison,  Trash Anthem by Dan Dietz
 2001  Classyass by Caleen Sinnette Jennings, Nightswim by Julia Jordan, Bake Off by Sheri Wilner
 2000 The Office by Kate Hoffower,  Creep by James Christy, 
 1999 Night Visits by Simon Fill
 1998 The Blue Room by Courtney Baron, Dancing With A Devil by Brooke Berman, Forty Minute Finish by Jerome Hairston, Mpls., St. Paul by Julia Jordan, Drive Angry by Matt Pelfrey, Labor Day by Sheri Wilner, Just Be Frank by Caroline Williams
 1997 "Acorn" by David Graziano
 1996 The Unintended Video by Dale Griffiths
 1990 Tone Clusters by Joyce Carol Oates

References

American theater awards
Awards established in 1979
Arts in Louisville, Kentucky
1979 establishments in Kentucky